Çetin is a common masculine Turkish given name. In Turkish, "Çetin" means "Tough", "Robust", "Strong", "Hard", and/or "Arduous".

People

Given name
 Çetin Alp (1947—2004), Turkish pop music singer
 Çetin Altan (1927—2015), Turkish writer, journalist, and a former member of parliament
 Çetin Emeç, prominent Turkish journalist and columnist, who was assassinated
 Çetin Güngör, Turkish footballer
 Çetin İnanç, Turkish film director
 Çetin Mandacı, Greek politician
 Çetin Özek, Turkish jurist, author and journalist
 Çetin Tekindor, Turkish actor
 Çetin Topçuoğlu, former Turkish taekwondo athlete, who died in the Gaza flotilla raid

Surname
 Arcan Cetin, American perpetrator of the Cascade Mall shooting
 Bülent Çetin (born 1985), Turkish amputee football player
 Cansu Çetin (born 1993), Turkish volleyball player
 Hikmet Çetin, Turkish politician
 Oğuz Çetin, Turkish football player
 Recep Çetin, Turkish footballer
 Serhat Çetin, Turkish basketball player
 Servet Çetin, Turkish footballer
 Sinan Çetin, Turkish actor, film director, and producer
 Yavuz Çetin, Turkish rock music artist

Masculine given names
Surnames
Turkish-language surnames
Turkish masculine given names